Nadka Golcheva (born 12 March 1952) is a Bulgarian former basketball player who competed in the 1976 Summer Olympics and in the 1980 Summer Olympics.

Golcheva grew up in a small village near Petrich, Bulgaria, in a working-class family. She was the youngest of four children in the family.  During the communist era in Bulgaria, most young people participated in different sports activities, which was also the case with her. Initially, she started with athletics, but a local coach invited her to the basketball court, and she joined the team.

Later in an interview, Golcheva admitted that her brother supported and encouraged her the most while the parents were more reserved.

 In 1967 Nadka Golcheva's local school team won the regional competition, and a year later, she was also selected for the Bulgarian youth national team.  So in 1969, she traveled to the capital Sofia, to join WBC Levski.

Club career

National team career 

For the Bulgarian national team, Nadka Golcheva played from 1969 to 1983. Her first appearance for the youth representation of the country was during a European  ChampionChip in 1968. However, Golcheva's most significant achievement was the Bronze medal on the summer Olympic games in 1976 and silver in 1980. On the European level, Nadka Golcheva won two Bronze and one Silver medal.

  1976 Summer Olympics
  1980 Summer Olympics
  EuroBasket Women 1972
  EuroBasket Women 1976
  EuroBasket Women 1983
  1977 Summer Universiade
 4th 1979 Summer Universiade

References

External links
Profile at Olympedia.org

1952 births
Living people
Basketball players at the 1976 Summer Olympics
Basketball players at the 1980 Summer Olympics
Bulgarian women's basketball players
Medalists at the 1976 Summer Olympics
Medalists at the 1980 Summer Olympics
Olympic basketball players of Bulgaria
Olympic bronze medalists for Bulgaria
Olympic medalists in basketball
Olympic silver medalists for Bulgaria
People from Blagoevgrad Province
Shooting guards
Sportspeople from Blagoevgrad Province